Pirita may refer to:
Pirita, a district of Tallinn, Estonia
Pirita (subdistrict), a subdistrict of Pirita district
Pirita River, a river in northern Estonia
Pîrîta, a commune in Dubăsari district, Moldova
Pirita, a village in Zlatna town, Alba County, Romania
Pirita, Karjalan tytär, a historical novel by Finnish author Kaari Utrio
Ripogonum scandens, a New Zealand native vine, sometimes called "Pirita"
a name for the mineral pyrite in Romance languages